Mustafa Ruhi Efendi (1800 - 1893, Istanbul, Ottoman Empire) was a shaikh of the Naqshbandi tariqah and political leader in the Balkans during the Ottoman period. Born on the Aegean island Imbros (present-day Gökçeada in Turkey), he moved as a young man at the Vilayet of Kosovo to the city of Kalkandelen (present-day Tetovo in North Macedonia). He was one of the participants of the League of Prizren which established the basis of Albanian nationalism, and was elected "President of the Central Committee of the League".
He was buried in the courtyard of the Yahya Efendi mausoleum in the Yıldız Palace park in Istanbul.

References

Islamic religious leaders from the Ottoman Empire
Political people from the Ottoman Empire
Albanians from the Ottoman Empire
Albanian nationalists
Naqshbandi order
1800 births
1893 deaths
19th-century people from the Ottoman Empire
19th-century Albanian people
People from Imbros
Albanian Sufis
Ottoman Sufis